Qaiser Iqbal Sindhu is a Pakistani politician who had been a Member of the Provincial Assembly of the Punjab from August 2018 till January 2023. Previously, he was a Member of the Provincial Assembly of the Punjab, from June 2008 to May 2018.

Early life
He was born on 31 December 1960.

Political career
He ran for the seat of the Provincial Assembly of the Punjab as an independent candidate for Constituency PP-99 (Gujranwala-IX) in 2002 Pakistani general election but was unsuccessful. He received 267 votes and defeated Sohail Zafar Cheema, a candidate of Pakistan Muslim League (Q) (PML-Q).

He was elected to the Provincial Assembly of the Punjab as a candidate for Pakistan Peoples Party for Constituency PP-99 (Gujranwala-IX) in by-polls held in June 2008. He received 33,943 votes and defeated Sohail Zafar Cheema, a candidate of PML-Q.

He was re-elected to the Provincial Assembly of the Punjab as a candidate of Pakistan Muslim League (N) (PML-N) from Constituency PP-99 (Gujranwala-IX) in 2013 Pakistani general election.

He was re-elected to Provincial Assembly of the Punjab as a candidate of PML-N from Constituency PP-60 (Gujranwala-X) in 2018 Pakistani general election.

References

Living people
Punjab MPAs 2013–2018
Punjab MPAs 2008–2013
1960 births
Pakistan Muslim League (N) MPAs (Punjab)
Punjab MPAs 2018–2023